Trinchesia miniostriata is a species of sea slug, an aeolid nudibranch, a marine gastropod mollusk in the family Trinchesiidae.

Distribution
This species was described from the Gulf of Naples, Italy. It has subsequently been reported from the east and south coasts of Spain.

References 

 Gofas, S.; Le Renard, J.; Bouchet, P. (2001). Mollusca. in: Costello, M.J. et al. (eds), European Register of Marine Species: a check-list of the marine species in Europe and a bibliography of guides to their identification. Patrimoines Naturels. 50: 180-21

External links
 

Trinchesiidae
Gastropods described in 1968